A by-election for the constituency of Edinburgh East in the United Kingdom House of Commons was held on 27 November 1947, caused by the appointment of the sitting Labour MP George Thomson as Lord Justice Clerk. The seat was retained by the Labour Party, with their candidate John Wheatley winning the seat.

Result

Previous elections

References

Bibliography
 Craig, F. W. S. (1983) [1969]. British parliamentary election results 1918-1949 (3rd edition ed.). Chichester: Parliamentary Research Services. . 
 
 A Guide to Post-War Scottish By-elections to the UK Parliament

East, 1954
Edinburgh East by-election
Edinburgh East by-election, 1947
Edinburgh East by-election
Edinburgh East by-election, 1947
Edinburgh East by-election